Fleece Glacier is a tributary glacier that enters Leppard Glacier on its north side about  east of Moider Peak, on the east side of Graham Land, Antarctica. The toponym is one in a group applied in the vicinity by the UK Antarctic Place-Names Committee that reflects a whaling theme, Fleece being the cook aboard the Pequod in Herman Melville's Moby-Dick.

References 

Glaciers of Oscar II Coast